Larson Brothers Guitars were popular in Chicago during the 1930s and 1940s. They made guitars sold under other companies names, including "Stahl, Maurer, Prairie State, Euphonon, Dyer, Bruno." They also made mandolins.

History
Carl Larson (1867–1946) and August Larson (1873–1944) were born in Sweden and emigrated to Chicago in the late 1880s. They worked as luthiers for guitar makers before buying Maurer & Company from Robert Maurer in 1900. They opened a retail shop on Elm Street.

The brothers patented techniques in guitar building, such as laminated bracing, metal support rods, and guitar top and back under tension. The guitars were sold under the Maurer name in addition to Euphonon, Prairie State, Stetson, and Stahl. They also built mandolins and harp guitars.

The Euphonon and Prairie State models were popular in the Midwest. After the transition of live radio broadcasts to recorded music in the 1950s, together with the prominence of the Fender and Gibson electric guitars, the Larson brothers guitars became passé, despite a brief resurgence in the Sixties. The harp guitar became essentially obsolete.

Fans of the guitars
In 1934, Les Paul was playing under the name Rhubarb Red. He was introduced to the Larson brothers by Doc Hopkins of the Cumberland Ridge Runners. Paul said that the brothers were unaware that he was the same person as Rhubarb Red. They insisted that Paul was a better guitarist. He wanted the brothers to build him a maple wood guitar with a half-inch solid maple top and no holes. They responded that without holes no sound would come out of the guitar. Paul was adamant, and for $45 he got his guitar, to which he added two pickups. It became one of the first electric guitars.

Larson brothers guitars were popular with the country and western singers on WLS-AM in Chicago and the National Barn Dance. They were played by Marjorie Lynn, the Prairie Ramblers, Arkie, the Arkansas Woodchopper, Gene Autry, and Patsy Montana.

On 25 June 1965, Bob Dylan went on stage at the Newport Folk Festival with an electric guitar. Dylan and the band rehearsed only three songs, leaving much of the audience wanting more.  This performance signaled Dylan's move towards a rock n’ roll with lyrical content and meaning, changing the genre forever. Johnny Cash also appeared later on stage using a Euphonon guitar, which he gave to Dylan after the show as a tribute to a fellow musician. Cash can be seen with this guitar in Shelton and Goldblatt's history of country music.

Revival
In 2007, the Larson Brothers brand was sold to Toni Gotz. He and Roman Zajicek, a luthier from the Czech Republic, built models based on the original Larson guitars. Then he met Maurice Dupont, a French luthier who wanted to remake the guitars. Beginning in 2013, Dupont's company built Larson model guitars in Boutiers Saint Trojan, Cognac, France.

References 

 Hartman, Robert C., The Larsons' Creations: Guitars & Mandolins, Centerstream, Anaheim Hills, 2007
 The Larson Brothers Guitars
 Three Larsons, Vintage Guitar magazine, April 2011
  Larson history at Acoustic Music
 Video at Antiques Road Show, PBS 

Guitar manufacturing companies of the United States
American brands